The 2021 Shoot Out (officially the 2021 BetVictor Snooker Shoot Out) was a professional ranking snooker tournament, that took place from 4 to 7 February 2021 at the Marshall Arena in Milton Keynes, England. It was the ninth ranking event of the 2020–21 snooker season. It was played under a variation of the standard rules of snooker. The event was the fourth of six events sponsored by BetVictor, making up the 2020-21 European Series.

Michael Holt was the defending champion, having defeated Zhou Yuelong 1–0 (64–1) in the 2020 final. In 2021, Holt was defeated by Matthew Stevens in the second round.

Ryan Day won the tournament for his third career ranking title, defeating Mark Selby 1–0 (67–24) in the final.

Tournament format

The tournament was played using a variation of the traditional snooker rules. All matches were played over a single , each of which lasted up to 10 minutes. The event featured a variable ; shots played in the first five minutes were allowed 15 seconds while the final five had a 10-second timer. Rather than a coin toss, a lag is used to choose which player . In the event of a draw, each player receives a shot at the  this is known as a "blue ball shootout". The event was broadcast by Eurosport.

Prize fund

The total prize fund for the event was £171,000 with the winner receiving £50,000. The breakdown of prize money is shown below:

 Winner: £50,000
 Runner-up: £20,000
 Semi-final: £8,000
 Quarter-final: £4,000
 Last 16: £2,000
 Last 32: £1,000
 Last 64: £500
 Last 128: £250 (Prize money at this stage did not count towards prize money rankings)
 Highest break: £5,000
 Total: £171,000

Tournament draw

Top half

Section 1

Section 2

Section 3

Section 4

Bottom half

Section 5

Section 6

Section 7

Section 8

Finals

Final

Century breaks 
Total: 1

 142  Mark Allen

Explanatory notes

Craig Steadman was playing as an amateur and achieved his best ever ranking event finish with a surprise semi-final appearance

References

External links
 

2021
2021 in snooker
2021 in English sport
2021
February 2021 sports events in the United Kingdom
Shoot Out